Verchain-Maugré (in the Middle Ages, Werchin) is a commune in the Nord department in northern France.

Between 1383 and 1415, the poet and renowned jouster Jean de Werchin was the lord of Werchin.

Heraldry

See also
Communes of the Nord department

References

Verchainmaugre